Asif Iqbal may refer to:

Asif Iqbal (lyricist), Bangladeshi lyricist
Asif Iqbal (Pakistani cricketer), (born 1943) Pakistani cricketer
Asif Iqbal (Emirati cricketer), Emirati cricketer
Asif Iqbal (Guantanamo detainee), former Guantanamo Bay detainee
Asif Iqbal (Ayodhya bombing suspect), arrested on suspicion of involvement in a terrorist bombing
Asif Iqbal (No Fly), received publicity because someone with the same name is on the U.S. government's No Fly List